Thomas Stanley may refer to:

Politicians
 Thomas Stanley (fl. 1382), Chancellor of the Duchy of Lancaster
 Thomas Stanley, 1st Baron Stanley (c. 1405–1459), English politician
 Thomas Stanley (15th-century MP), MP for Lancashire, 1433
 Thomas Stanley (Lancashire MP, died 1571), MP for Liverpool, 1547, and Bossiney, 1558
 Sir Thomas Stanley (Lancashire MP, died 1576) (1532/33–1576), Sheriff and MP for Lancashire, 1571
 Thomas Stanley (Cheshire MP), MP for Cheshire, 1571
 Thomas Stanley (Maidstone MP) (1581–1669), MP for Maidstone, 1624 and 1625
 Sir Thomas Stanley of Grangegorman (1626–1674), knighted by Henry Cromwell in 1659
 Sir Thomas Stanley, 4th Baronet (1670–1714), British MP for Preston, 1695–1698
 Thomas Stanley (Lancashire MP, born 1749), MP for Lancashire, 1780–1812
 Thomas Stanley (Lancashire MP, born 1753), MP for Lancashire, 1776–1779
 Thomas B. Stanley (1890–1970), Governor of Virginia, 1954–1958
 Thomas M. Stanley, American politician in the Massachusetts House of Representatives

Others
Thomas Stanley, 1st Earl of Derby (1435–1504), English aristocrat
Thomas Stanley, 2nd Earl of Derby (bef. 1485–1521), English aristocrat
Thomas Stanley (bishop) (1510–1568), Bishop of Sodor and Man
Thomas Stanley (Royal Mint) (died 1571), English officer of the Mint
Thomas Stanley (author) (1625–1678), English author and translator
Thomas J. Stanley (1944–2015), American author
Thomas E. Stanley, Dallas-based American architect